Comrade Detective is an American buddy cop series created by Brian Gatewood and Alessandro Tanaka. The show follows the premise of popular US action/cop-buddy films and television shows from the 1980s and presents the episodes as a fictional lost Romanian television show commissioned by the Communist Party to promote a communist worldview during the Cold War. Every episode was filmed in Romania using local actors and then dubbed into English as part of the effect. It was released on Amazon Prime Video on August 4, 2017.

Plot
Channing Tatum and Jon Ronson present the show as if it were an actual influential Romanian television show from the 1980s. Produced by the Romanian communist government, it served as a device to promote a communist worldview opposed to Western capitalism and imperialism during the Cold War. Lost over the years, producers recently found surviving copies of the episodes. With the help of the fictional Romanian Film Preservation Society they have restored the episodes and dubbed them into English.

Within the show hard-boiled but troubled Bucharest police detective Gregor Anghel and his partner respond to a drug bust against the orders of their Captain. This results in a man in a Ronald Reagan mask killing his partner in front of him. Anghel, along with his new partner from the countryside, Iosif Baciu, must solve his partner's murder. In doing so, they uncover an insidious western plot to indoctrinate Romanian society with capitalism and religion.

Cast
Each character is portrayed by a Romanian actor, as well as an English-language voice actor. The show was first filmed using Romanian actors speaking Romanian. Actors then over-dubbed every role in English.

Main
 Florin Piersic Jr. as Gregor Anghel
 Channing Tatum as English dub of Gregor Anghel 
 Corneliu Ulici as Iosif Baciu
 Joseph Gordon-Levitt as English dub of Iosif Baciu

Recurring
 Adrian Paduraru as Captain Covaci
 Nick Offerman as English dub of Captain Covaci
 Olivia Nita as Jane
 Jenny Slate as English dub of Jane
 Florin Galan as Dragos
 Jason Mantzoukas as English dub of Dragos
 Diana Vladu as Sonya Baciu
 Chloë Sevigny as English dub of Sonya Baciu
 Ion Grosu as Stan
 Jake Johnson as English dub of Stan
 Tipsy Angelo as Tipsy
 John DiMaggio as English dub of Tipsy and several other miscellaneous voice parts
 Channing Tatum as himself
 Jon Ronson as himself

Guest stars
 Richard Bovnoczki as Father Anton Streza 
 Daniel Craig as English dub of Father Anton Streza 
 Cristian Popa as Nikita Ionescu
 Beck Bennett as English dub of Nikita Ionescu
 Odin Neilsen as Andrei Baciu
 Colleen O'Shaughnessey as English dub of Andrei Baciu
 Vali Pavel as Petre Bubescu
 Bobby Cannavale as English dub of Petre Bubescu
 Radu Romaniuc as Orzan
 Fred Armisen as English dub of Orzan.
 Ille Gâliea as Vasile
 Tracy Letts as English dub of Vasile.
 Ruxandra Enescu as Sally Smith
 Kim Basinger as English dub of Sally Smith
 Silviu Geamanu as Coach
 Mahershala Ali as English dub of Coach
 Ana Ciontea as Iona Anghel
 Debra Winger as English dub of Iona Anghel
 Cornel Ciupercescu as Vlad Anghel
 Richard Jenkins as English dub of Vlad Anghel
 Paul Octavian Diaconescu as Nastase
 Jerrod Carmichael as English dub of Nastase
 Mihai Stefan as Sergiu
 Bo Burnham as English dub of Sergiu
 George Burcea as Todd
 Mark Duplass as English dub of Todd
 Magda Dimitrescu as Tatiana/Trisha
 Katie Aselton as English dub of Tatiana/Trisha
 Nicu Banea as Stefan
 Mark Proksch as English dub of Stefan and several other parts
 Madalin Mladinovici as Markos Miklos
 John Early as the English dub of Markos Miklos and several other parts.
 Cozma Eugeniu as New York Degenerate
 Bobby Lee as English dub of New York Degenerate.

Production
When first conceiving the series, executive producer Channing Tatum asked the creators to bring him the worst ideas they could think of, with the reasoning "When you try to find something that is not working, you figure out what's cool about it, and you can find some really hidden gems." Gatewood and Tanaka pitched a satire series that spoofed Communist propaganda from the 1980s. The two had become fascinated with Soviet propaganda television after seeing a mid-1980s PBS documentary on Soviet broadcasts. They initially looked into dubbing over real Eastern Bloc television shows but realized it would be easier to make their own show rather than procure the rights.

The series takes inspiration from the Czechoslovakian show Thirty Cases of Major Zeman. They also took inspiration from the idea that growing up, American 1980s movies like Red Dawn served as both entertainment and propaganda. It also took inspiration from the East German series  and the American film Lethal Weapon. By making the propaganda and inaccuracies obvious to a western audience, they hoped to make the subtle nature of modern propaganda more clear. Tanaka stated that the goal was to create the inverse Soviet equivalent of the type of Russian-villain entertainment common in 1980s America.

Episodes were initially written in English before being translated into Romanian. The shows were filmed in Romania with local cast. Other than the director of photography, writers and director, the entire cast and crew were locally recruited in Romania. The English-language actors were only cast after the series had been filmed and edited.

In an unlikely coincidence worth mention, the main Romanian actor, Florin Piersic Jr. is the son of Florin Piersic, the main actor of a pretty similar Romanian film series that appeared in 1980-1987, Mărgelatu, which claims the settings of years 1840s-1850s in Romania in 6 episodes: The Road of the Bones (1980), The Yellow Rose (1982), The Mysteries of Bucharest (1983), The Silver Mask (1985), The Turqoise Necklace (1986), and Everything Costs (1987). In the third episode of Mărgelatu, The Mysteries of Bucharest as in The Turquise Necklace, the two main heroes (Florin Piersic and stunt master Szabolcs Cseh) preempt an attempt by Austrian Empire to foment a revolution as a pretext to invade and take control of the Romanian state found at the time under king Bibescu, in somewhat similarly intricate intrigues and stunts as the ones recalled by Comrade Detective to be happening 150 years later with the atmosphere leading to the 1989 revolution. The police quarters scenes are also similar to the ones in the Brigade Diverse in Alert (1970-1971).

Episodes

Reception
Comrade Detective received mostly positive reactions from critics. Rotten Tomatoes indicated that 82% of critics gave the series a positive review. On Metacritic the series received a score of 66 out of 100 based on 12 critics.

Ben Travers of IndieWire gave the show a positive review, calling it a sharp satire. He focused in on the show's goal of deconstructing propaganda, claiming, "They're not simply here to make you laugh. They're not here to upset you. They're here to make you think differently and enjoy your time doing it. By that gauge, Comrade Detective is a roaring success. By the basic metric of thoroughly engaging television, it's still a winner." 

James Poniewozik of The New York Times gave it a less enthusiastic review, claiming that the show committed too much to its initial joke and ran too long. He concluded, "It's a brilliant idea. But it's not much more than an idea."

See also
Romanian profanity

References

External links
 

Amazon Prime Video original programming
2017 American television series debuts
2017 American television series endings
Fictional Romanian police detectives
Romanian comedy television series
2010s American parody television series
2010s American police comedy television series
Communism in fiction
Television series set in 1983
Television series by A24
Television series by Amazon Studios